"Hunting Pink" (also known as "Where There's a Will" and "A Hunting We Will Go" and as "Tally-Ho") is an episode of the British comedy television series The Goodies. Written by The Goodies, with songs and music by Bill Oddie.

Plot
Graeme and Bill invite themselves along when Tim decides to visit his great-uncle Butcher at his country mansion "Tally Ho Towers", and they are waited on by Butcher's butler, Basterville.  Tim is hoping to inherit his great-uncle's money and Graeme and Bill coerce Tim into agreeing to share the money with them.

Butcher leaves his money to Tim in his will — and soon after has a fatal accident.  Tim as the new owner of the mansion gives in to hunting — much to the disgust of Bill and Graeme, who then have to cure Tim of his hunting obsession with aversion therapy.

References

 "The Complete Goodies" — Robert Ross, B T Batsford, London, 2000
 "The Goodies Rule OK" — Robert Ross, Carlton Books Ltd, Sydney, 2006
 "From Fringe to Flying Circus — 'Celebrating a Unique Generation of Comedy 1960-1980'" — Roger Wilmut, Eyre Methuen Ltd, 1980
 "The Goodies Episode Summaries" — Brett Allender
 "The Goodies — Fact File" — Matthew K. Sharp

External links
 

The Goodies (series 3) episodes
1973 British television episodes